Ellsworth Woodward (1861–1939) was an American artist and art educator. During the late 19th century in New Orleans, Ellsworth and his older brother William Woodward were two of the most influential figures in Southern art. Ellsworth was born 1861 in Seekonk, Massachusetts, but the two brothers made New Orleans their home (around 1876) and devoted themselves to promoting Southern culture and art as artists, teachers and administrators. Ellsworth Woodward is best known for founding the Newcomb Pottery movement, and for his landscape-structure, genre, etcher.

Biography 
Woodward was born in 1861 in Seekonk, MA and died in 1939 in New Orleans, LA, where he spent the majority of his adult life. From 1887 to 1931, he was a member of the art department faculty at Tulane University.

Museums 

Woodward's work is in the Charleston Museum, The Brooklyn Museum of Art, Lauren Rogers Museum of Art, Louisiana State University Museum of Art, Morris Museum of Art, Museum of Fine Arts, Houston, the Ogden Museum of Southern Art, and the Newcomb Art Gallery.

Painting discovered by Goodwill 

In 2009, an employee of Goodwill Industries in Nashville, Tennessee discovered a Woodward painting that was about to be discarded in a trash bin. The painting was auctioned online and sold for $8,000.

References

External links
 

1861 births
1939 deaths
Landscape artists
Artists from Louisiana
Tulane University faculty